Kingsbury Fish and Wildlife Area is a protected area that covers  of grasslands, wetlands, and crop fields dedicated to providing hunting and fishing opportunities. It is located south on County Road 650W, near Kingsbury, Indiana.

History
Kingsbury was formerly the Kingsbury Arsenal of the U.S. Army. After the base closed in the 1960s, the land was transferred to the State of Indiana for wildlife preservation.

Facilities
Wildlife Viewing
Picnicking
Ice Fishing
Hunting
Trapping
Shooting Range
Archery Range
Dog Training Area
Boat Ramp (Electric trolling motors only)

References

Parks in Indiana
Protected areas of LaPorte County, Indiana